Vanetina is a village in the Municipality of Cerkvenjak in northeastern Slovenia. It lies in the Slovene Hills. The area is part of the traditional region of Styria and is now included in the Drava Statistical Region.

The local chapel-shrine was built in around 1900 and has a large belfry.

References

External links
Vanetina on Geopedia

Populated places in the Municipality of Cerkvenjak